The 2001–02 United Counties League season was the 95th in the history of the United Counties League, a football competition in England.

Premier Division

The Premier Division featured 19 clubs which competed in the division last season, along with two new clubs, promoted from Division One:
Daventry Town
Deeping Rangers

League table

Division One

Division One featured 15 clubs which competed in the division last season, along with two new clubs, relegated from the Premier Division:
Eynesbury Rovers
Potton United

League table

References

External links
 United Counties League

2001–02 in English football leagues
United Counties League seasons